Polistroma is a genus of lichenized fungi in the family Thelotremataceae. This is a monotypic genus, containing the single species Polistroma fernandezii.

References

Ostropales
Lichen genera
Ostropales genera